The Ministry of Social Justice  is a ministry of the Government of Maharashtra. It is responsible for welfare, social justice and empowerment of disadvantaged and marginalized sections of society.

The Ministry is headed by a cabinet level minister. Eknath Shinde is current Chief Minister of Maharashtra and Minister of Social Justice.

Head office

List of Cabinet Ministers

List of Ministers of State

List of Principal Secretary

History
The ministry was formed in 1928. The Welfare Department was established in 1932. The Social Welfare Directorate was created on 23 September 1957.

Institutions
Several institutes are started by the ministry for marginalized sections of society.
Ashram Schools
Residential Schools
Hostels
Institutions for person with disability

References

External links

Government ministries of Maharashtra